Eastern Harps is a Gaelic Athletic Association club based in east County Sligo, including Keash, Gurteen, Culfadda, Monasteraden and Ballinafad.

Notable players
 Paul Taylor

Honours
 Sligo Senior Football Championship: (7)
 1975, 1993, 1995, 1998, 2002, 2008, 2010
 Sligo Intermediate Football Championship: (1)
 1983
 Sligo Under 20 Football Championship: (3)
 1994, 1998, 2001
 Sligo Minor Football Championship: (3)
 1993, 2000, 2004, 2017
 Sligo Under-16 Football Championship: (6)
 1991, 1996, 2006, 2014(A2), 2015, 2016
 Sligo Under-14 Football Championship: (7)
 1982, 1985, 1996, 2000, 2009(B), 2012(A2), 2016(B1) 
 Sligo Senior Football League (Division 1):
1990, 1995, 1997, 2002, 2003, 2005, 2008
 Sligo Intermediate Football League Division 3 (ex Div. 2):
1983, 2003
 Sligo Junior Football League (Division 5):
 1994, 2001
 Kiernan Cup: (3)
 1990, 1994, 1995
 Benson Cup: (2)
 2007, 2009

References

Gaelic games clubs in County Sligo